The Home Office Building is located adjacent to Military Park at 10 Park Place in Newark, Essex County, New Jersey, United States. The building was built in 1928 and was added to the National Register of Historic Places on June 17, 1982.

The building is one of two existing structures in downtown Newark commissioned by the Firemen's Insurance Company, an insurance company founded in 1855, to house its offices.

The Military Park building was designed by prominent father-and-son Newark architects John H. & Wilson C. Ely.  Construction began in 1924 and the building was completed in 1928. In 1982 the building was designated a New Jersey Historic Place and a National Historic Place. The 10-story building has  of space. The Berger Organization purchased the building in 1990, the same year a plaque was placed on it by the Newark Preservation and Landmarks Committee. The building underwent renovations in 2006.

An inscription on a bronze plaque placed by the Newark Preservation and Landmarks Committee reads:

Firemen's Insurance Building

An elaborate Victorian Firemen's Insurance Company Building was constructed at Broad and Market Streets circa 1870. It featured a metallic fireman scupluture on one of its mansarded towers. A tower replaced it in 1910.

The 1910 Firemen's Insurance Building replaced it on the northeast corner of Broad and Market streets, at Four Corners, the spot was once considered one of the busiest intersections in the United States. Completed in 1910, the sixteen-story structure was the first skyscraper in the city, and the tallest in the entire state.  The architects were Marvin, Davis & Turton.

See also
National Register of Historic Places listings in Essex County, New Jersey
List of tallest buildings in Newark
Fireman's Insurance Company Building, Washington DC

References

Neoclassical architecture in New Jersey
Office buildings completed in 1924
National Register of Historic Places in Newark, New Jersey
Insurance company headquarters in the United States
New Jersey Register of Historic Places
Skyscraper office buildings in Newark, New Jersey